Le Gibloux (1,204 m) is a mountain of the Swiss Prealps, overlooking the Lake of Gruyère in the canton of Fribourg.

The Gibloux Radio Tower, operated by Swisscom, is located on the mountain's southern summit, with an accessible public viewing platform, and views stretching in every direction.

References

External links 

 Le Gibloux on Hikr

Mountains of Switzerland
Mountains of the Alps
Mountains of the canton of Fribourg
One-thousanders of Switzerland